The 2017 Cork Senior Football Championship was the 129th staging of the Cork Senior Football Championship since its establishment by the Cork County Board in 1887. The draw for the 2017 fixtures took place on 11 December 2016. The championship began on 9 April 2017 and ended on 22 October 2017.

Carbery Rangers were the defending champions, however, they were defeated by St. Finbarr's at the semi-final stage.

On 22 October 2017, Nemo Rangers won the championship after a 4-12 to 3-13 defeat of St. Finbarr's in a final replay at Páirc Uí Chaoimh. This was their 20th championship title overall and their first title since 2015.

Steven Sherlock of the St. Finbarr's club was the championship's top scorer with 2-48.

Team changes

To Championship

Promoted from the Cork Intermediate Football Championship
 Kiskeam

Results

Preliminary round

Round 1

Round 2A

Round 2B

Relegation play-offs

Round 3

Clyda Rovers received a bye in this round.

Round 4

Carbery Rangers, Castlehaven, and Duhallow received byes in this round.

Quarter-finals

Semi-finals

Finals

Championship statistics

Top scorers

Top scorers overall

Top scorers in a single game

References

Cork Senior Football Championship
Cork Senior Football Championship